The 1993 Aloha Bowl was a post-season college football bowl game played on December 25, 1993.  The game matched the Fresno State Bulldogs of the Western Athletic Conference and the Colorado Buffaloes of the Big Eight Conference and featured two eventual Pro Bowl quarterbacks: Fresno State's Trent Dilfer and Colorado's Kordell Stewart.  Colorado won, 41–30.

Scoring Summary
1st Quarter
CU - Rashaan Salaam - 2 Yard Touchdown run (Mitch Berger Kick); 7-0 CU
CU - Mitch Berger - 44 yard field goal; 10-0 CU 
CU - James Hill - 7 Yard Touchdown Run (Berger kick); 17-0 CU 
2nd Quarter
FS - Derek Mahoney - 27 Yard Field Goal; 17-3 CU
CU - Mitch Berger - 49 Yard Field Goal; 20-3 CU
FS - Jamie Christian - 13 Yard Kick Return fumbled, recovered by Malcolm Seabron 68 Yards for Touchdown (Mahoney kick); 20-10 CU
3rd Quarter
CU - Rashaan Salaam - 40 yard touchdown run (Berger kick); 27-10 CU
FS - Anthonny Daigle - 1 yard Touchdown run (Mahoney kick blocked); 27-16 CU
CU - Donnell Leomiti - fumble returned 28 yards for touchdown (Berger Kick); 34-16 CU
FS - Tydus Winans - 8 yard touchdown pass from Trent Dilfer (Daigle 2 Point Pass from Dilfer); 34-24 CU
'''4th Quarter
CU - Rashaan Salaam - 4 yard touchdown run (Berger Kick); 41-24 CU
FS - Tydus Winans - 11 yard Touchdown pass from Trent Dilfer (Dilfer 2 Point Pass Failed); 41-30 CU

References

Rose Bowl
Aloha Bowl
Colorado Buffaloes football bowl games
Fresno State Bulldogs football bowl games
December 1993 sports events in the United States
1993 in sports in Hawaii